Warlock Moon is a 1973 American horror film written and directed by Bill Herbert and starring Laurie Walters, Joe Spano and Edna MacAfee.

Premise
A young college student believes she had seen ghosts when she first visited an abandoned spa with an unknown  companion who had accosted her and "accidentally" driven her there. When she goes there to meet him the second time she ends up the victim of cannibals.

Cast
 Laurie Walters as Jenny Macallister/Ghost Bride
 Joe Spano as John Devers
 Edna MacAfee as Agnes Abercrombi
 Harry Bauer as Hunter
 Steve Solinsky as Axman
 Richard Vielle as Axman

Release

Home media
The film was released on DVD by Shriek Show on August 17, 2004. Shriek Show later re-released the film as a part of its "Cannibal Lunch Box Triple Feature" on December 4, 2011.

Reception

Joseph A. Ziemba from Bleeding Skull.com wrote, "Shrugging off flaws like dandruff, Warlock Moon is a living urban legend that’s supported by a fine haze of low budget, 1970s goodness. It’s not for everyone and that’s what counts. If you’re in tune with your tastes, this film is a modest miracle drug."

See also
 List of American films of 1973

References

External links
 
 
 
 

1973 films
1973 horror films
1970s serial killer films
1970s thriller films
American supernatural horror films
Films about cannibalism
Films set in California
American ghost films
Films about Satanism
American serial killer films
American supernatural thriller films
Films about witchcraft
Films shot in San Francisco
1970s English-language films
1970s American films